Zev Wolf of Zbaraz (died 3 Nisan (25 March) 1822) was a Hasidic rabbi. He was the third son of Rabbi Yechiel Michel of Zlotshov, known as "The Maggid of Zlotshov".

See also
Zev Wolf (disambiguation page)

References

1822 deaths
Year of birth missing
People from Zbarazh
People from the Kingdom of Galicia and Lodomeria
Ukrainian Jews
Jews from Galicia (Eastern Europe)